The Tire Society is a professional body, specifically an engineering society, whose mission is to increase and disseminate knowledge as it pertains to the science and technology of tires. It hosts a two-day Meeting and Conference every year. In addition, it publishes a peer reviewed technical journal, Tire Science and Technology. The Tire Society was founded on 24 March 1980.

Awards
The society has two professional award recognitions: the Distinguished Service Award and the Distinguished Achievement award.  

Distinguished Service Award Recipients
1990 Floyd Conant
1991 Fred Kovac
1996 David Benko
2005 Jozef DeEskinazi
2012 Marion Pottinger
2022 Joseph Walter

Distinguished Achievement Award Recipients
2009 Samuel Kelly Clark
2011 Takashi Akasaka
2013 Hans Pacejka
2021 Timothy B. Rhyne and Steven M. Cron

References

External links
Tire Society Website

Tires